Edwin T. Pratt (December 6, 1930 – January 26, 1969) was an American activist during the Civil Rights Movement. At the time of his assassination in 1969, he was Executive Director of the Seattle Urban League.

Life
Born in Miami, Florida, Pratt received his bachelor's degree from Clark College (Atlanta, Georgia) and his master's in social work from Atlanta University.  He worked for the Urban League in Cleveland, Ohio, and Kansas City, Missouri, before arriving in Seattle in 1956 to be the Seattle league's Community Relations Secretary. In 1961, he became the Executive Director of the Seattle Urban League. Among his achievements was the Triad Plan for the desegregation of the Seattle Public Schools; he also led an initiative for equal housing opportunities.

Pratt was killed outside his home in Shoreline, Washington, a suburb immediately north of Seattle.  Two men were involved in the shooting; it is presumed that a third drove the getaway car. It is still unknown who killed him.

Pratt was survived by his wife, Bettye, his son Bill, and his daughter Miriam Katherine, who was five years old at the time of his death.

He is commemorated today by Seattle's Pratt Park, the Pratt Fine Arts Center, and the Shoreline School District's Edwin Pratt Early Learning Center.

Pratt Fine Arts Center serves as a lasting tribute to Edwin T. Pratt, a man who relentlessly championed open and equal access to educational and housing opportunities for all of Seattle's residents. Pratt Fine Arts Center honors his memory by continuing to pursue its mission of making art accessible to everyone, for people of all ages, skill levels, and backgrounds.

See also

List of unsolved murders

Notes

External links
Heather Trescases, "Edwin Pratt is murdered outside of his Shoreline home on January 26, 1969", gives an extensive account of Pratt's assassination and the subsequent investigations.

Archives

 The Seattle Urban League Records 1930-1997. 103.16  cubic feet.  At the Labor Archives of Washington, University of Washington Libraries Special Collections.

1930 births
1969 deaths
1969 murders in the United States
African-American activists
Activists for African-American civil rights
Activists from Seattle
Assassinated American civil rights activists
Deaths by firearm in Washington (state)
Male murder victims
Murdered African-American people
People from Miami
People from Shoreline, Washington
People murdered in Washington (state)
Unsolved murders in the United States
African-American history of Washington (state)